Otter Lake is a freshwater lake located on the western slope of Otter Point northwest of Maple Valley in King County, Washington. Self-issued Alpine Lake Wilderness permit required for transit within the Big Snow Mountain area. Other prominent lakes are west of Otter Lake, including Angeline Lake, Azurite Lake and Big Heart Lake, while Opal Lake and other Necklace Valley lakes are on the eastern slope of Otter Point. Because Otter Lake is at the heart of the Alpine Lakes Wilderness, the lake is a popular area for hiking, swimming, and fishing.

See also 
 List of lakes of the Alpine Lakes Wilderness
 Waterfalls of the West Fork Foss River Valley

References 

Lakes of King County, Washington
Lakes of the Alpine Lakes Wilderness
Okanogan National Forest